Acrocercops distylii is a moth of the family Gracillariidae. It is known from Japan (Honshū, Kyūshū, Shikoku, Tusima and the Ryukyu Islands).

The wingspan is 8.5–11 mm. The species has various forms which are very different in colourpattern. They seem different species, but all emerged from the same plant species, sometimes from the same breeding series, and agree well with the typical specimens in genital structure.

The larvae feed on Distylium racemusum. They mine the leaves of their host plant.

References

distylii
Moths described in 1988
Moths of Japan